Keene (formerly, Wells) is a census-designated place (CDP) in Kern County, California in the foothills of the Tehachapi Mountains at the southern extreme of the San Joaquin Valley. The population was 469 at the 2020 census, up from 431 at the 2010 census.

The headquarters of the United Farm Workers (UFW), a national farmworkers organization organized and led by Cesar Chavez, is located in Keene, and is sometimes referred to as "Nuestra Señora Reina de La Paz" ("Our Lady Queen of Peace").

Keene is located in the greater Tehachapi area.

Geography

Climate 

Keene is categorized as being within the 8b USDA hardiness zone, meaning temperatures can get as low as 15 to 20 °F.

History
The Keene post office opened in 1879, closed in 1881, and re-opened in 1885. Keene was founded in 1876 with the name Wells as a railroad town. The name Wells honored Madison P. Wells, a local rancher. The town was renamed Keene in honor of James P. Keene, a financier.

César Chávez

The UFW moved its national headquarters to Keene from Delano, California. César Chávez spent his last years in Keene. The walls of his United Farm Workers office in Keene were lined with hundreds of books ranging in subject from philosophy, economics, cooperatives, and unions, to biographies of Gandhi, the Kennedys, and Che Guevara. He is buried at 29700 Woodford Tehachapi Rd, Keene, CA 93531, on the campus of the UFW headquarters.

The National Chavez Center was opened on the UFW campus in 2004 by the Cesar E. Chavez Foundation.  It currently consists of a visitor center, memorial garden and the grave site of the civil rights leader.  When it is fully completed, the  site will include a museum and conference center to explore and share Chávez's work. A two-acre parcel of the site was designated as César E. Chávez National Monument on October 8, 2012.

Demographics

2010
The 2010 United States Census reported that Keene had a population of 431. The racial makeup of Keene was 385 (89.3%) White, 2 (0.5%) African American, 10 (2.3%) Native American, 8 (1.9%) Asian, 0 (0.0%) Pacific Islander, 16 (3.7%) from other races, and 10 (2.3%) from two or more races. Hispanic or Latino of any race were 47 persons (10.9%).

The Census reported that 431 people (100% of the population) lived in households, 0 (0%) lived in non-institutionalized group quarters, and 0 (0%) were institutionalized.

There were 186 households, out of which 38 (20.4%) had children under the age of 18 living in them, 126 (67.7%) were opposite-sex married couples living together, 12 (6.5%) had a female householder with no husband present, 4 (2.2%) had a male householder with no wife present.  There were 9 (4.8%) unmarried opposite-sex partnerships, and 2 (1.1%) same-sex married couples or partnerships. 36 households (19.4%) were made up of individuals, and 13 (7.0%) had someone living alone who was 65 years of age or older. The average household size was 2.32.  There were 142 families (76.3% of all households); the average family size was 2.59.

The population was spread out, with 63 people (14.6%) under the age of 18, 22 people (5.1%) aged 18 to 24, 59 people (13.7%) aged 25 to 44, 213 people (49.4%) aged 45 to 64, and 74 people (17.2%) who were 65 years of age or older.  The median age was 53.0 years. For every 100 females, there were 95.9 males.  For every 100 females age 18 and over, there were 88.7 males.

There were 225 housing units at an average density of 23.3 per square mile (9.0/km2), of which 157 (84.4%) were owner-occupied, and 29 (15.6%) were occupied by renters. The homeowner vacancy rate was 1.9%; the rental vacancy rate was 14.7%.  361 people (83.8% of the population) lived in owner-occupied housing units and 70 people (16.2%) lived in rental housing units.

2000
As of the census of 2000, there were 339 people, 136 households, and 99 families residing in the CDP. There were 177 housing units at an average density of 18.2 per square mile (7.0/km2). The racial makeup of the CDP was 81.71% White, 2.95% Native American, 7.08% from other races, and 5.60% from two or more races.  10.91% of the population were Hispanic or Latino of any race.

There were 136 households, out of which 22.8% had children under the age of 18 living with them, 70.6% were married couples living together, 2.2% had a female householder with no husband present, and 26.5% were non-families. 22.8% of all households were made up of individuals, and 7.4% had someone living alone who was 65 years of age or older.  The average household size was 2.49 and the average family size was 2.93.

In the CDP, the population was spread out, with 23.0% under the age of 18, 2.9% from 18 to 24, 22.1% from 25 to 44, 38.6% from 45 to 64, and 13.3% who were 65 years of age or older.  The median age was 46 years. For every 100 females, there were 106.7 males.  For every 100 females age 18 and over, there were 108.8 males.

The median income for a household in the CDP was $49,500, and the median income for a family was $59,583. Males had a median income of $60,078 versus $27,813 for females. The per capita income for the CDP was $27,986.  About 22.5% of families and 24.7% of the population were below the poverty line, including 33.3% of those under age 18 and 14.3% of those age 65 or over.

References

Census-designated places in Kern County, California
Populated places established in 1876
Tehachapi Mountains
Census-designated places in California
1876 establishments in California